The Oconee War was a military conflict in the 1780s and 1790s between European Colonists and the Creek Indians known as the Oconee, who lived in an area between the Apalachee and North Oconee rivers in the state of Georgia.

The struggle arose from tensions between competing groups of people as increasing numbers of European Americans entered traditional Oconee territory. Georgia claimed the land had been ceded by the Creeks based on the treaties of Augusta and Galphinton, but the local Creek did not recognize the validity of those treaties and asserted their control starting in 1785. The conflict delayed the opening of the University of Georgia, planned as part of the new state's institutions.  The European Americans prevailed over the Creek, and a tradition of coexistence between the groups ended.  The European Americans wanted to settle the land, and they demanded the government relocate the Creek, which contributed eventually to passage of the Indian Removal Act of 1830, setting policy and implementation of removal of all the southeastern tribes to west of the Mississippi River. The war catalyzed Georgia voters' ratifying the United States Constitution, in order to gain federal help to fight the Creek.

As a result of the war, some Creek Oconee moved across the border into northern Florida, and then further south in the state, to escape European-American encroachment.  They joined other majority-Creek peoples there, and developed a new Muskogean-related tribe, the Seminole, by the late eighteenth century. Through the Seminole Wars of the nineteenth century, some of the Indians resisted all efforts by extensive United States forces to move them to reservations.

See also

Elijah Clarke
Alexander McGillivray
Trans-Oconee Republic

References

Wars between the United States and Native Americans
Wars involving the indigenous peoples of North America
History of Georgia (U.S. state)